Baychar (born 1949) is an American artist. Her work is included in the collections of the Smithsonian American Art Museum, the Minneapolis Institute of Art and the Fine Arts Museums of San Francisco.

Baychar was born Baychar Umholtz in Maine in 1949 and at times lived in Banff, Canada. The former director of the American Folk Art Museum, Dr. Robert Bishop, was her guardian. In the 1980s he introduced the artist to Andy Warhol who suggested that Baychar drop her last name, Umhotz. She currently resides in Kingfield, Maine.

References

1949 births
Living people
Artists from Maine
People from Augusta, Maine